Bahram Vallis is an ancient river valley in the Lunae Palus quadrangle of Mars at 20.7° north latitude and 57.5° west longitude.  It is about 302 km long and was named after the word for 'Mars' in Persian. Bahram Vallis is located midway between Vedra Valles and lower Kasei Valles.  It is basically a single trunk valley, with scalloped walls in some places.  The presence of streamlined erosional features on its floor shows that fluid was involved with its formation.

References

See also

 Geology of Mars
 HiRISE
 Lunae Palus quadrangle
 Outflow channels

Valleys and canyons on Mars
Lunae Palus quadrangle